The Lonesome Chap is a 1917 American drama silent film directed by Edward LeSaint and written by Harvey Gates and Emma Rochelle Williams. The film stars Louise Huff, House Peters, Sr., John Burton, Eugene Pallette, J. Parks Jones and Pietro Buzzi. The film was released on April 19, 1917, by Paramount Pictures.

Plot

Cast 
Louise Huff as Renee D'Armand
House Peters, Sr. as Stuart Kirkwood
John Burton as Doc Nelson
Eugene Pallette as George Rothwell
J. Parks Jones as George Rothwell Jr.
Pietro Buzzi as Victor D'Armand 
Betty Johnson as Peggy Carter

References

External links 
 

1917 films
1910s English-language films
Silent American drama films
1917 drama films
Paramount Pictures films
Films directed by Edward LeSaint
American black-and-white films
American silent feature films
1910s American films